Storey Glacier is a glacier on the northeast side of Drygalski Fjord at the southeast end of South Georgia. Named by the United Kingdom Antarctic Place-Names Committee (UK-APC) after Bryan C. Storey, British Antarctic Survey (BAS) geologist, 1974–79, who worked in the area, 1976–78.

See also
 List of glaciers in the Antarctic
 Glaciology

Glaciers of South Georgia